The Pindos is breed of pony or small horse native to the Pindus mountain range in Thessaly and Epirus in Greece. It is also present in mountainous parts of Thrace and Macedonia. There is a feral herd near Neochori, Karditsa, close to Lake Plastiras.

The Pindos is hardy and frugal, with good stamina, and is used for riding, driving, and as a pack and draught animal for forestry and farming. The hooves are boxy and narrow but strong, so shoeing is not often needed.

In 2002 the recorded population consisted of 464 breeding mares and 81 stallions.

References

Further reading 

Pindos
Horse breeds originating in Greece